Prismosticta hyalinata is a moth in the family Endromidae first described by Arthur Gardiner Butler in 1885. It is found in Japanese islands of Honshu, Shikoku and Kyushu.

The wingspan is 27–30 mm. Adults are sexually dimorphic.

The larvae feed on Symplocaceae species.

References

Moths described in 1885
Prismosticta
Moths of Japan